In enzymology, a lithocholate 6beta-hydroxylase is an enzyme that catalyzes the chemical reaction

lithocholate + NADPH + H+ + O2  6beta-hydroxylithocholate + NADP+ + H2O

The 4 substrates of this enzyme are lithocholate, NADPH, H+, and O2, whereas its 3 products are 6beta-hydroxylithocholate, NADP+, and H2O.

This enzyme belongs to the family of oxidoreductases, specifically those acting on paired donors, with O2 as oxidant and incorporation or reduction of oxygen. The oxygen incorporated need not be derived from O2 with NADH or NADPH as one donor, and incorporation of one atom o oxygen into the other donor.  The systematic name of this enzyme class is lithocholate,NADPH:oxygen oxidoreductase (6beta-hydroxylating). Other names in common use include lithocholate 6beta-monooxygenase, CYP3A10, 6beta-hydroxylase, and cytochrome P450 3A10/lithocholic acid 6beta-hydroxylase.

References

 
 
 
 

EC 1.14.13
NADPH-dependent enzymes
Enzymes of unknown structure